The Medical Services Department of the Armed Forces and the Egyptian Army Medical Corps are the departments responsible for the hospitals and medical facilities of the Egyptian Armed Forces including the Army medical schools.

History 
The need for Army medical services became apparent to Muhammad Ali during a campaign due to mass attrition. The French doctor, Antoine Clot, became the Chief Doctor of the Army. Clot persuaded Ali to established the first Army School of Medicine in Abu Zaabal in 1827. The first of its kind in the region, it was later expanded with Pharmacy and Midwifery schools.

In the war in Afghanistan, the Medical Corps opened the Egyptian Field Hospital at Bagram in Afghanistan to treat civilians.

Large number of military hospitals are active across Egypt. Many of these centers accept civilian patients. Cairo's Bridge Military Hospital (opened 2011; new additions planned through 2019), is part of an ongoing effort by the Egyptian Army to offer cutting-edge treatment and patient care. The facility has 840 beds spread between major surgery, respiratory disease, and emergency units. Smaller specialized centers in dental, cardiac, and ophthalmological care account for an additional 205 beds.

Egypt's Military Medical Academy was founded in 1979 with the purpose of educating and training medical officers in all branches of Egypt's armed forces. The facility is located on Ihsan Abdul Quddus Street in Cairo. It is associated with the Armed Forces Medical College, founded in 1827. This was the Middle East's first modern school of medicine and was a product of Egypt's newly established Military Department of Health during the administration of Muhammad Ali Pasha.

Spurious claims about HIV/AIDS  
At a press conference in February 2014 by Egyptian Gen. Ibrahim Abdel-Atti, chief of the medical branch, falsely claimed that the Egyptian Army had "defeated AIDS... with a rate of 100%" as well as hepatitis C. Abdel-Atti claimed to construct a method to extract the disease and break it into amino acids, "so that the virus becomes nutrition for the body instead of disease." It is said that this treatment process could take anywhere between 20 days and 6 months to cure having no side effects. Egypt intends to delay exporting their new technology to generate medical tourism into the country. The claims were eventually confirmed to be false.

Structure 
The Medical Services Department runs about 48 fixed military hospitals, listed below.

The Army's Medical Corps may have 27 Field Medical Battalions (1st to 27th); 107 Field Medical Companies (201st to 308th); and possibly some hospital barges.

List of Military Hospitals 

Source is the Egyptian Ministry of Defence site:

References

External links 
https://egyptdefreview.wordpress.com/2017/09/08/egyptian-medical-corps-where-are-egypts-combat-medics/
https://publishing.cdlib.org/ucpressebooks/view?docId=ft5t1nb3mq&chunk.id=d0e496&toc.depth=1&toc.id=d0e496&brand=ucpress
http://www.mma.edu.eg/History.aspx

Military units and formations of Egypt
Military medical organizations